Probable C->U-editing enzyme APOBEC-2 is a protein that in humans is encoded by the APOBEC2 gene.

References

External links

Further reading

EC 3.5.4